Pratima Puri (died 29 July 2007) was an Indian journalist best  known for being Doordarshan’s first newsreader.

Early life 
She was born as Vidya Rawat to a Gorkha family at Laal Paani in Shimla, the capital city of Himachal Pradesh. Puri graduated from Delhi University's Indraprastha College for Women.

Career 
Pratima started her media career at the All India Radio (AIR) station in her hometown.

When All India Radio had its first telecast on September 15, 1959, Pratima was shifted to New Delhi. She became an anchor when DD started its first news bulletin in 1965. She interviewed prominent figures like Yuri Gagarin (the first man to travel into space), and various actors and politicians. After Salma Sultan was chosen to replace her, Pratima Puri started training aspiring anchors in Doordarshan.

Personal life 
Pratima Puri died in 2007.

References

Doordarshan
Indian television presenters
2007 deaths
Year of birth missing
Indian Gorkhas